Colin Hayter Crickmay (1899–1988) was Canadian geomorphologist known for his contributions to river and hillslope erosion. Influenced by the observations of the geologist Eleanora Knopf he coined the concept of unequal activity to describe the great disparities that can between stream erosion near stream channels and apparently unchanged uplands, and between headwaters with limited erosion and the more active middle and lower courses of streams. Crick did also coin the term panplanation to describe a planation surfaces thought to be formed by lateral stream migration.

References

1899 births
1988 deaths
Canadian geographers
20th-century Canadian geologists
Geomorphologists
20th-century geographers